Driving Miss Daisy is a 1989 American comedy-drama film directed by Bruce Beresford and written by Alfred Uhry, based on his 1987 play of the same name. The film stars Jessica Tandy, Morgan Freeman, and Dan Aykroyd. Freeman reprised his role from the original Off-Broadway production.

The story defines Daisy and her point of view through a network of relationships and emotions by focusing on her home life, synagogue, friends, family, fears, and concerns over a twenty-five-year period.

Driving Miss Daisy was a critical and commercial success upon its release and at the 62nd Academy Awards received nine nominations, and won four: Best Picture, Best Actress (for Tandy), Best Makeup, and Best Adapted Screenplay. , it is the most recent PG-rated film to have won Best Picture.

Plot
In 1948, Daisy Werthan, or Miss Daisy, a 72-year-old wealthy, Jewish, widowed, retired schoolteacher, lives alone in Atlanta, Georgia, except for a black housekeeper, Idella. When Miss Daisy drives her 1946 Chrysler Windsor into her neighbor's yard, her 40-year-old son, Boolie, buys her a 1949 Hudson Commodore and hires 60-year-old Hoke Colburn, a black chauffeur. Boolie claims to Hoke that Miss Daisy may not appreciate his efforts, but she cannot fire him, as Boolie himself is his employer. Miss Daisy at first refuses to let anyone drive her, but Hoke convinces her to be driven. She reluctantly accepts the first two trips, but tries to get Boolie to fire Hoke after discovering a can of salmon missing from her pantry. However, she relents when Hoke, unprompted and before she is able to confront him, admits to eating the salmon and offers her a replacement can he had bought.

As Miss Daisy and Hoke spend time together, she gains appreciation for his many skills and teaches him to read for the first time using her teacher skills and resources. After Idella dies in the spring of 1963, rather than hire a new housekeeper, Miss Daisy decides to care for her own house and have Hoke do the cooking and the driving. Hoke, meanwhile, buys the cars that he drives Daisy in after they are traded in for newer models and is able to gradually negotiate higher salaries with Boolie.

The film explores racism against black people, which affects Hoke personally. The film also touches on antisemitism in the South. After her synagogue is bombed, Miss Daisy realizes that she is also a victim of prejudice. However, American society is undergoing radical changes, and Miss Daisy attends a dinner at which Dr. Martin Luther King Jr. gives a speech.

She initially invites Boolie to the dinner, but he declines, and suggests that Miss Daisy invite Hoke. However, Miss Daisy only asks him to be her guest during the car ride to the event and ends up attending the dinner alone. Hoke, who is insulted by the manner of the invitation, listens to the speech on the car radio outside.

Hoke arrives at the house one morning in 1971 to find Miss Daisy agitated and showing signs of dementia; she believes that she is a young teacher again. Hoke calms her down with a conversation in which Daisy calls Hoke her "best friend." Boolie arranges for Miss Daisy to enter a retirement home. In 1973, Hoke, now 85 and rapidly losing his eyesight, retires. Boolie, now 65, drives Hoke to the retirement home to visit Miss Daisy, now 97. He then feeds her thanksgiving pie after the two catch up. The final scene is an image of him driving her for the first time in the red Hudson.

Cast

Reception

Box office
Driving Miss Daisy was given a limited release on December 15, 1989, earning $73,745 in three theaters. The film was given a wide release on January 26, 1990, earning $5,705,721 over its opening weekend in 895 theaters, becoming the number one film in the United States. It remained at number 1 the following week but was knocked off the top spot in its third weekend of wide release by Hard to Kill. It returned to number one the next weekend and remained there for a fourth week.  The film ultimately grossed $106,593,296 in North America, and $39,200,000 in other territories, for a worldwide total of $145,793,296. The film was released in the United Kingdom on February 23, 1990.

Critical reaction
Driving Miss Daisy was well received by critics, with particular emphasis on the screenplay and Freeman and Tandy's performances. The review aggregator Rotten Tomatoes gives the film a "Certified Fresh" 84% rating based on reviews from 102 critics, with an average score of 7.70/10. The website's critical consensus states: "While it's fueled in part by outdated stereotypes, Driving Miss Daisy takes audiences on a heartwarming journey with a pair of outstanding actors." On Metacritic, which assigns a rating out of 100 based on reviews from mainstream critics, the film has a score of 81 based on 17 reviews, indicating "universal acclaim". CinemaScore similarly reported that audiences gave the film a rare "A+" grade.

Gene Siskel of the Chicago Tribune declared Driving Miss Daisy one of the best films of 1989. Roger Ebert of the Chicago Sun-Times called it "a film of great love and patience" and wrote, "It is an immensely subtle film, in which hardly any of the most important information is carried in the dialogue and in which body language, tone of voice or the look in an eye can be the most important thing in a scene. After so many movies in which shallow and violent people deny their humanity and ours, what a lesson to see a film that looks into the heart."

Peter Travers of Rolling Stone also gave the film a positive review, calling Tandy's performance "glorious" and opining, "This is Tandy's finest two hours onscreen in a film career that goes back to 1932." The performances of Tandy and Freeman were also praised by Vincent Canby of The New York Times, who observed, "The two actors manage to be highly theatrical without breaking out of the realistic frame of the film."

On the other hand, the film has been criticized for its handling of the issue of racism. Candice Russell of the South Florida Sun-Sentinel described Freeman's character as having a "toadying manner" which was "painful to see", and said that the film was ultimately "one scene after another of a pompous old lady issuing orders and a servant trying to comply by saying 'yassum.'" The film's nomination for Best Picture at the Academy Awards over Spike Lee's Do the Right Thing was controversial. Lee later reflected on the controversial decision by saying that Driving Miss Daisy was "not being taught in film schools all across the world like Do the Right Thing is."

Awards and nominations
Driving Miss Daisy received 9 Academy Award nominations and also achieved the following distinctions in Oscar history:
 It is the only film based on an off-Broadway production ever to win Best Picture.
 Jessica Tandy (at age 80), became the oldest winner in history to win Best Actress.
 It was the first Best Picture winner since Grand Hotel in 1932 to not also receive a Best Director nomination (this has only occurred three times since, Argo in 2012 and Green Book in 2018, and CODA in 2021; Wings the first to win Best Picture in 1927 did not have a nomination for director William A. Wellman). In his opening monologue at the 62nd awards ceremony, host Billy Crystal made fun of this irony by calling it "the film that apparently directed itself".
 As of 2022, it is the last Best Picture winner that was rated PG. All the winners since have been rated PG-13 or R.

AFI 100 Years 100 Cheers - No.77

Oscar "test of time" recount
In 2015, The Hollywood Reporter polled hundreds of Academy members, asking them to re-vote on past close run decisions. Academy members indicated that, given a second chance, they would award the 1990 Oscar for Best Picture to My Left Foot instead.

Soundtrack
The film's score was composed by Hans Zimmer, who won a BMI Film Music Award and was nominated for a Grammy Award for Best Instrumental Composition Written for a Motion Picture or for Television for his work. The score was performed entirely by Zimmer, done electronically using samplers and synthesizers, and did not feature a single live instrument. There is a scene, however, in which the "Song to the Moon" from the opera Rusalka by Antonín Dvořák is heard on a radio as sung by Gabriela Beňačková.

Similarities have been noted between the main theme and the "plantation" folk song "Shortnin' Bread". The soundtrack was issued on Varèse Sarabande.

Home media
The film was also successful on home video. It was released on DVD in the United States on April 30, 1997, and the special edition was released on February 4, 2003. The movie was first released on Blu-ray disc in Germany, and was finally released on Blu-ray in the United States in a special edition digibook in January 2013 by Warner Bros. 

In the UK, Warner Home Video released Driving Miss Daisy on VHS in 1989. Driving Miss Daisy was then released on DVD in 2005 by Universal Pictures Home Entertainment and then in 2008 by Pathé through 20th Century Fox Home Entertainment.

References

External links

 
 
 
 
 

1989 films
1980s buddy comedy-drama films
1980s road comedy-drama films
American buddy comedy-drama films
American road comedy-drama films
1980s English-language films
Hebrew-language films
Best Musical or Comedy Picture Golden Globe winners
Best Picture Academy Award winners
Films scored by Hans Zimmer
Films about automobiles
Films about educators
Films about old age
Films about race and ethnicity
Films about racism in the United States
American films based on plays
Films directed by Bruce Beresford
Films featuring a Best Actress Academy Award-winning performance
Films featuring a Best Musical or Comedy Actor Golden Globe winning performance
Films featuring a Best Musical or Comedy Actress Golden Globe winning performance
Films set in Atlanta
Films set in the 1940s
Films set in the 1950s
Films set in the 1960s
Films set in the 1970s
Films that won the Academy Award for Best Makeup
Films whose writer won the Best Adapted Screenplay Academy Award
Warner Bros. films
Druid Hills, Georgia
Films about Jews and Judaism
Films produced by Richard D. Zanuck
1989 comedy films
1989 crime drama films
The Zanuck Company films
Cultural depictions of Martin Luther King Jr.
Films set in Alabama
Films about antisemitism
1980s American films